Mössner or Mossner is a German language habitational surname. Notable people with the name include:
 Ernest Campbell Mossner (1907–1986), American academic
 Lukas Mössner (1984), Austrian footballer

German-language surnames
German toponymic surnames